Saladin Bargicho (born 31 May 1994) is an Ethiopian professional footballer who plays as a defender for Ethiopian Premier League club Saint George.

International career
In January 2014, coach Sewnet Bishaw, invited him to be a part of the Ethiopia squad for the 2014 African Nations Championship. The team was eliminated in the group stages after losing to Congo, Libya and Ghana.

International goals
Scores and results list Ethiopia's goal tally first.

References

External links 
 

1994 births
Living people
Ethiopian footballers
Ethiopia international footballers
Association football defenders
Ethiopia A' international footballers
2014 African Nations Championship players
Saint George S.C. players